The Pleasanton Weekly is a weekly newspaper published in Pleasanton, California, established in 2000. Owned by Embarcadero Media, the newspaper serves Pleasanton, California.

In 2017, Jeremy Walsh took over as the paper's editor from the founding editor Jeb Bing.  The newspaper also maintains an online version on its website. The Pleasanton Weekly is distributed free to all households every Friday, as well as via businesses and street newsstands.

As of 2020, the print circulation is 9,500 and the digital reach is 180,000 monthly total visits. 90% of the paper's revenue comes from the print edition.

Awards and recognition 
The newspaper has won multiple first-place awards from the California Newspaper Publishers Association. Awards include first-place Coverage of Local Government from the 2018 California Journalism Awards Digital Contest and first-place Editorial Comment from the 2019 California Journalism Awards Print Contest.

External links

References

Newspapers published in the San Francisco Bay Area
Pleasanton, California
Weekly newspapers published in California